The 2020 Football Championship of Khmelnytskyi Oblast was won by Ahrobiznes Nova Ushytsia.

First stage

Group 1

Group 2

Group 3

Final stage

References

Football
Khmelnytskyi
Khmelnytskyi